Tione di Trento (Local dialect: Tió) is a comune (municipality) in Trentino in the northern Italian region Trentino-Alto Adige/Südtirol, located about  west of Trento.  
 
Tione di Trento borders the following municipalities: Ragoli, Villa Rendena, Preore, Comano Terme, Bleggio Superiore, Bondo, Bolbeno, Breguzzo, Zuclo, Roncone, Lardaro, Ledro and Pieve di Bono.

It is a centre for production of candles.

History 

Until 1918, Tione was part of the Austrian monarchy (Austria side after the compromise of 1867), head of the district of the same name, one of the 21 Bezirkshauptmannschaften in the Tyrol province.
A post-office was opened in 1851.

References

External links
 Official website 

Cities and towns in Trentino-Alto Adige/Südtirol